Jack Draper may refer to

 Jack Draper (cinematographer) (1892–1962), American cinematographer
 Jack Draper (tennis) (born 2001), British tennis player